Summer Breeze Open Air is an annual German heavy metal music festival. It was first held in 1997. The festival had been held in Abtsgmünd until 2006 when it was moved to its new location of Dinkelsbühl, Bavaria. The festival draws around 40,000 attendees annually.

Lineup history

2004
Summer Breeze Open Air 2004 was held from Thursday, 19 August to Saturday, 21 August.

2005 
Summer Breeze Open Air 2005 was held from Thursday, 18 August to Saturday, 20 August.

2006 
Summer Breeze Open Air 2006 was held from Thursday, 17 August to Saturday, 19 August.

2007
16 – 18 August 2007
Absolute – After Forever – Amon Amarth – Black Messiah – Blitzkid — Bolt Thrower – Caliban — Communic – Crematory – Dagoba – Dark Fortress – Dark Funeral – Dark Tranquillity – Deadlock – Die Apokalyptischen Reiter – Disillusion – Dornenreich – Doro – Eisbrecher – End of Green – Eluveitie – Before the Dawn — Fall of Serenity – Fear My Thoughts – Finntroll – Hardcore Superstar – Helrunar – Hevein – Illdisposed – Immolation – Impious – In Extremo – Justice – Karakadan – Koldbrann – Krypteria – Lacrimas Profundere – L'Âme Immortelle – Machinemade God – Maroon – Moonsorrow – Necrophobic – Nevermore – Nightrage – Oomph! – Pain – Poisonblack – Powerwolf – President Evil – Rage – Secrets of the Moon – Sirenia – Soulfly – Squealer A.D. – Suffocation – Swallow the Sun – Tankard – Tanzwut – The Black Dahlia Murder – Volbeat – War from a Harlot's Mouth – Xandria

2008
14–16 August 2008
Cradle of Filth, Helloween, Subway to Sally, Six Feet Under, Paradise Lost, Arch Enemy, As I Lay Dying, Heaven Shall Burn, ASP, Kataklysm, H-Blockx, Soilwork, Exodus, Ensiferum, Anathema, Primordial, Primal Fear, Marduk, End of Green, Korpiklaani, Destruction, Pro-Pain, Eluveitie, Sonic Syndicate, the Wildhearts, Dismember, Behemoth, Neaera, Saltatio Mortis, Emil Bulls, The Vision Bleak, Graveworm, Keep of Kalessin, Cult of Luna, Megaherz, Mad Sin, Autumn, Endstille, Orphaned Land, Born from Pain, 3 Inches of Blood, Hollenthon, Aborted, Schelmish, All Ends, Týr, Hail of Bullets, Onslaught, Mustasch, The Rotted, Novembre, Dark Fortress, Cephalic Carnage, Jesus on Extasy, Shadow Reichenstein, Blood Red Throne, Rotten Sound, Diablo Swing Orchestra, Midnattsol, Misery Speaks, Fleshcrawl, Despised Icon, Lay Down Rotten, Hackneyed, Sworn, Debauchery, Textures, Månegarm, Negură Bunget, Dark Age, XIV Dark Centuries, Heidevolk, Enemy of the Sun, Ahab, The Old Dead Tree, Anima, Beloved Enemy, Nmemine, Hacride, Agrypnie, Drone, Misanthrope, Kissin' Dynamite

2009
13–15 August 2009

 Amon Amarth
 Amorphis
 Anaal Nathrakh
 Backyard Babies
 Battlelore
 Before the Dawn
 Beneath the Massacre
 Benighted
 Black Messiah
 Born from Pain
 Brainstorm
 Callejon
 Corvus Corax
 Cataract
 Cynic
 Dagoba
 Deadlock
 Deathstars
 Elvenking
 Entombed
 Epica
 Equilibrium
 Evocation
 The Faceless
 Firewind
 Ghost Brigade
 God Dethroned
 Grand Magus
 Grave
 Haggard
 Hate
 Hate Eternal
 The Haunted
 J.B.O.
 Jack Slater
 Katatonia
 Katra
 Koldbrann
 Kreator
 Legion of the Damned
 Life of Agony
 Misery Index
 Moonspell
 Narziss
 The New Black
 One Way Mirror
 Opeth
 The Other
 Powerwolf
 Protest the Hero
 Psychopunch
 Psycroptic
 Raunchy
 The Red Chord
 Sabaton
 Sacred Steel
 Schandmaul
 Skyforger
 The Sorrow
 The Storm
 Suffocation
 Suicide Silence
 Sylosis
 Unearth
 Unheilig
 Unlight
 Unsun
 Urgehal
 Vader
 Voivod
 Volbeat
 Vomitory
 Vreid
 Waylander

2010
19–21 August 2010

 1349
 The 69 Eyes
 Ahab
 Anathema
 Annotations Of An Autopsy
 Asphyx
 Barren Earth
 Be'lakor
 Callisto
 Cannibal Corpse
 Children of Bodom
 The Crown
 Cumulo Nimbus
 Dark Funeral
 Dark Tranquillity
 Deadstar Assembly
 Despised Icon
 The Devil's Blood
 Die Apokalyptischen Reiter
 Dying Fetus
 Eisbrecher
 Eisregen
 Endstille (replacement act for Behemoth)
 Equilibrium
 FeuerschwanzFejd
 Fiddler's Green
 Frei.Wild
 Hacride
 Hail of Bullets
 Hypocrisy
 Ill Niño
 InMe
 Insomnium
 Korpiklaani
 Kylesa
 Leaves' Eyes
 Letzte Instanz
 Long Distance Calling
 Maroon
 Milking The Goatmachine
 Mono Inc.
 My Dying Bride
 Necrophagist
 Obituary
 Origin
 Orphaned Land
 Parkway Drive
 Poisonblack
 Rage
 Rebellion
 Sólstafir
 Sepultura
 Subway to Sally
 Suicidal Angels
 Swallow the Sun
 The Foreshadowing
 Tracedawn
 Unleashed
 Van Canto
 Velero
 War from a Harlot's Mouth
 We Butter the Bread with Butter

2011
18–20 August 2011

 9mm Assi Rock'n'Roll
 A Pale Horse Named Death
 Amorphis
 Arch Enemy
 Arcturon
 Blitzkid
 Bolt Thrower
 Caliban
 Corvus Corax
 Criminal
 Davidian
 Deadlock
 Decapitated
 Demonical
 Der Weg Einer Freiheit
 Destruction
 Devil Sold His Soul
 Einherjer
 Engel
 Enslaved
 Excrementory Grindfuckers
 Facebreaker
 Farmer Boys
 Farewell to Arms
 Hail of Bullets
 HammerFall
 Hatebreed
 Hell
 Imperium Dekadenz
 In Extremo
 Internment
 J.B.O.
 Kalmah
 Kampfar
 Kvelertak
 Marduk
 Melechesh
 Moonsorrow
 Neaera
 Primordial
 Rev 16.8
 ReVamp
 Rotting Christ
 Saltatio Mortis
 Scar Symmetry
 Shear
 Skeletonwitch
 Smoke Blow
 Sodom
 Sonic Syndicate
 Steve from England
 Suicidal Tendencies
 Swashbuckle
 Sylosis
 Týr
 Tarja Turunen
 The Haunted
 The Ocean
 The Sorrow
 Trigger the Bloodshed
 Turisas
 Vader
 Vomitory
 Vreid
 Witchery
 Wolf

2012
16–18 August 2012

 Agrypnie
 Ahab
 Alcest
 Amoeba
 Amon Amarth
 Anaal Nathrakh
 Arsirius
 ASP
 Asphyx
 Audrey Horne
 Be'lakor
 Before the Dawn
 Behemoth
 Black Sun Aeon
 Bleed from Within
 Born from Pain
 Buffet of Fate
 Cattle Decapitation
 Corvus Corax
 Crowbar
 Dark Tranquillity
 Darkest Hour
 Deathstars
 Deez Nuts
 Desaster
 Dew-Scented
 Die Apokalyptischen Reiter
 Die Kassierer
 Eisregen
 Eluveitie
 Entrails
 Epica
 Eskimo Callboy
 Every Time I Die
 Excrementory Grindfuckers
 Farsot
 Ghost Brigade
 Glorior Belli
 Goodbye to Gravity
 Hatesphere
 Heidevolk
 Helheim
 Iced Earth
 Immortal
 In Solitude
 Incantation
 Insomnium
 Jasta VS. Windstein
 Katatonia
 Krisiun
 Lacuna Coil
 Manegarm
 Menhir
 Mono Inc.
 Morgoth
 Mystic Prophecy
 Naglfar
 Napalm Death
 Nifelheim
 Night In Gales
 Nile
 Norma Jean
 Obscure Sphinx
 Oomph!
 Paradise Lost
 Peter Pan Speedrock
 Rotterfeld
 Sepultura
 Shining
 Sick of It All
 Six Feet Under
 Subway to Sally
 Tanzwut
 Terror
 The Foreshadowing
 The Rotted
 The Unguided
 Toxic Holocaust
 Unearth
 Unleashed
 Vallenfyre
 We Butter the Bread with Butter
 While She Sleeps
 Within Temptation
 Without Words

2013
15–17 August 2013

 Agnostic Front
 Amorphis
 Alestorm
 Anthrax
 Architects
 Benediction
 Bury Tomorrow
 Carach Angren
 Cliteater
 Dark Funeral
 Der Weg Einer Freiheit
 Destruction
 Divide
 Dr. Living Dead
 Dying Fetus
 Eisbrecher
 Emmure
 Ensiferum
 Fear Factory
 Feuerschwanz
 Fiddler's Green
 Finntroll
 Firewind
 First Blood
 Fleshgod Apocalypse
 Grand Supreme Blood Court
 Grave
 Haggard
 Hate
 Hammercult
 Hatebreed
 In Flames
 Knorkator
 Korpiklaani
 Lamb of God
 Letzte Instanz
 Long Distance Calling
 Marduk
 Merrimack
 Moonspell
 Mustasch
 Nachtblut
 Neaera
 Necrophobic
 Orden Ogan
 Orphaned Land
 Powerwolf
 Primordial
 Pro-Pain
 Rotten Sound
 Sabaton
 Saltatio Mortis
 Sister Sin
 Soilwork
 Tiamat
 The Bones
 Tristania
 Vader
 Van Canto
 Walls of Jericho
 We Came as Romans
 Winterfylleth
 Witchcraft

2014
14–16 August 2014

 Aborted
 Ahab
 Alcest
 Alpha Tiger
 Anneke van Giersbergen
 Annisokay
 Arch Enemy
 August Burns Red
 Behemoth
 Benediction
 Biohazard
 Blasmusik Illenschwang
 Blues Pills
 Bodyfarm
 Brainstorm
 Caliban
 Callejon
 Carcass
 Carnal Ghoul
 Children of Bodom
 Chrome Division
 Cripper
 Crucified Barbara
 Cyrcus
 Deadlock
 Death Angel
 Decapitated
 Delain
 Devin Townsend Project
 Die Kassierer
 Down
 Eat the Gun 
 Einherjer
 Eluveitie
 Enforcer
 Equilibrium
 Ereb Altor
 Eskimo Callboy
 Excrementory Grindfuckers
 Fjoergyn
 Gamma Ray
 Gingerpig
 Gothminister
 Grand Magus
 Gutalax
 Hail of Bullets
 Hamferð
 Heaven Shall Burn
 Heretoir
 His Statue Falls
 Hypocrisy
 Ignite
 Impaled Nazarene
 Imperium Dekadenz
 Insomnium
 In Extremo
 Iwrestledabearonce
 JBO
 Kampfar
 Kärbholz
 Lay Down Rotten
 Legion of the Damned
 Lost Society
 Machine Head
 Malrun
 Mantar
 Maroon
 Master
 Mono Inc.
 Mors Principium Est
 Motorjesus
 My Sleeping Karma
 Obituary
 Omega Massif
 Omnium Gatherum
 Pentagram Chile
 Primal Fear
 Rise of the Northstar
 Rotting Christ
 Sahg
 Science of Sleep
 Screamer
 Secrets of the Moon
 Skeletonwitch
 Stahlmann
 Supercharger
 Tarja Turunen
 Tenside
 Testament
 Texas in July
 The Agonist
 The Haunted
 The Idiots
 The Ocean
 The Unguided
 The Very End
 The Vintage Caravan
 Thyrfing
 Todtgelichter
 Tracy Ate a Bug
 Tragedy
 Twilight of the Gods
 Undertow
 Waldgeflüster
 Watain
 Winter of Sin
 Wintersun
 Wolfheart
 Wound

2015
12-15 August 2015

 Agalloch
 Alestorm
 Amorphis
 Antropomorphia
 Any Given Day
  Autumnal 
  Avatarium 
 Battle Beast
 Be'lakor
  Below 
 Belphegor
 Betraying the Martyrs
 Black Stone Cherry
 Bloodbath
 Blutengel
 Breakdown of Sanity
 Cannibal Corpse
 Carach Angren
 Carnifex
 Chapel of Disease
 Combichrist
 Corvus Corax
 Cradle of Filth
 CROWN
 Dark Fortress
 Dark Tranquillity
 Death Angel
  Death to All 
 Demonical
 Deserted Fear
 Destruction
 Devilment
 Diablo Blvd.
 Die Apokalyptischen Reiter
 Dornenreich
 Dreamshade
 Drescher
 Dust Bolt
 Eisregen
 Ektomorf
 Emil Bulls
 Ensiferum
 Finsterforst
 Fire Red Empress
 Fuck You and Die
 Ghost Brigade
 Gloryhammer
 Hackneyed
 Hämatom
 Hark
 Hatebreed
 Haudegen
 Heidevolk
 Hour of Penance
 Inquisition
 Isole
 John Coffey
 Kadavar
 Kataklysm
 Kissin’ Dynamite
 Knorkator
 Kreator
 Kyle Gass Band
 Lantlôs
 Lifeless
 Majesty
 Marduk
 Megaherz
 Milking the Goatmachine
 Morgoth
 Nachtgeschrei
 Nailed to Obscurity
 Ne Obliviscaris
 Neaera
 Necrotted
 Nervosa
 Nightwish
 Obey the Brave
 Opeth
 Ost+Front
 Panzer
 Paradise Lost
 Powerwolf
 Pripjat
 Pyogenesis
 Rectal Smegma
 Reliquiae
 Revel in Flesh
 Rogash
 Saltatio Mortis
 Schirenc plays Pungent Stench
 Sepultura
 Serum 114
 Severe Torture
 Sick of It All
 Sister Sin
 Sodom
 Sonic Syndicate
 Steve 'N' Seagulls
 Suicidal Angels
 Suicide Silence
 Tankard
 Temple of Baal
 Terror Universal
 The Duskfall
 The Gogets
 The Green River Burial
 The Sirens
 Thränenkind
 Thy Art Is Murder
 To the Rats and Wolves
 Trivium
 Troldhaugen
 TrollfesT
 Venom
 Vitja
 Walls of Jericho

2016
17-20 August 2016

 Abbath
 Accu§er
 Aeverium
 Agnostic Front
 Airbourne
 Almanac
 Arch Enemy
 Argyle Goolsby and The Roving Midnight
 Arkona
 Arktis
 Asenblut
 Asking Alexandria
 At the Gates
 Batushka
 Beyond the Black
 Bliksem
 Blues Pills
 Bömbers
 Bombus
 Burning Down Alaska
 Bury Tomorrow
 Carcass
 Cattle Decapitation
 Cliteater
 Coheed and Cambria
 Conan
 Coppelius
 D-A-D
 Deadlock
 Deez Nuts
 Downfall of Gaia
 Dying Fetus
 Dyscordia
 Eisbrecher
 Emmure
 Entombed A.D.
 Equilibrium
 Evil Invaders
 Exodus
 Fäulnis
 Fear Factory
 Feuerschwanz
 Goitzsche Front
 Gorod
 Grailknights
 Grand Magus
 Graveyard
 GYZE
 H2O
 Harakiri for the Sky
 Heart of a Coward
 Hell City
 High Fighter
 Illdisposed
 Implore
 In the Woods…
 Insanity Alert
 Iron Reagan
 Kärbholz
 Katatonia
 Ketzer
 Kneipenterroristen
 Korpiklaani
 Letzte Instanz
 Lord of the Lost
 Lost Society
 Mantar
 Mastodon
 Monuments
 Moonsorrow
 Mr. Hurley & Die Pulveraffen
 My Dying Bride
 Napalm Death
 Nasty
 Nim Vind
 Nocte Obducta
 Novelists
 Obscura
 Obscure Infinity
 Ohrenfeindt
 Omnium Gatherum
 One I Cinema
 Pain
 Parasite Inc.
 Parkway Drive
 Primordial
 Psychopunch
 Queensrÿche
 Randale
 Rotten Sound
 Sabaton
 Saille
 Satyricon
 Skálmöld
 Slaughterday
 Slayer
 Soilwork
 Stallion
 Steak Number Eight
 Steel Panther
 Stepfather Fred
 Stick to Your Guns
 Subway to Sally
 Swallow the Sun
 Testament
 The Black Dahlia Murder
 The New Roses
 The Other
 The Word Alive
 Thundermother
 Toxpack
 Tragedy
 Traitor
 Tribulation
 Undertow
 Unearth
 Unleashed
 Vader
 Versengold
 Winterstorm
 Wolfheart
 Zodiac

2017 
16–19 August 2017

 1349
 Amon Amarth
 Amorphis
 Architects
 Asphyx
 August Burns Red
 Battle Beast
 Belphegor
 Cellar Darling
 Chelsea Grin
 Children of Bodom
 Corvus Corax
 Crowbar
 Cryptopsy
 Cypecore
 Dark Tranquility
 Decapitated
 Delain
 Devin Townsend Project
 Eisregen
 Eluveitie
 Emil Bulls
 End of Green
 Ensiferum
 Epica
 Erdling
 Fiddler's Green
 Finntroll
 Gorguts
 Haggard
 Hatebreed
 Heaven Shall Burn
 In Extremo
 Insomnium
 Knorkator
 Korn
 Kreator
 Life of Agony
 Megadeth
 MGLA
 Miss May I
 Mono Inc.
 Moonspell
 Nile
 Obituary
 Overkill
 Possessed
 Sacred Reich
 Sonata Arctica
 Steve 'N' Seagulls
 Suffocation
 Terror
 Tiamat
 Wardruna
 Whitechapel
 Wintersun

2018 
15-18 August 2018 

 Alestorm
 Amaranthe
 Annisokay
 Any Given Day
 Arch Enemy
 At the Gates
 Backyard Babies
 Bannkreis
 Beartooth
 Behemoth
 The Black Dahlia Murder
 Blasmusik
 Bloodbath
 Broken Teeth
 Cannibal Corpse
 Caliban
 Die Apokalyptischen Reiter
 Dirkschneider
 Dying Fetus
 Eisbrecher
 Eskimo Callboy
 Farmer Boys
 Feuerschwanz
 Goatwhore
 Graveyard
 Illenschwang
 Jasta Kadavar
 JBO
 Kataklysm
 Korpiklaani
 Metal Allegiance
 Misery Index
 Mr. Hurley & Die Pulveraffen
 The Night Flight Orchestra
 Obscura
 Orange Goblin
 Orden Ogan
 Origin
 Paradise Lost
 Ross the Boss
 Salatio Moris
 Schandmaul
 Sepultura
 Sirenia
 Sick of It All
 Solstafir
 Tankard
 Toxic Holocaust
 Wolfheart

Publications

DVDs 
 Summer Breeze – All Areas 2002 (Warner Music Group, 2002)
Tracks
Gurd – Older But Wiser
Brainstorm – Blind Suffering
Die Apokalyptischen Reiter – Gone
Amon Amarth – Bleed For Ancient Gods
Soilwork – Flame Out
End of Green – Highway 69
Bloodflowerz – Diabolic Angel
Emil Bulls – Symphony Of Destruction
Sentenced – Blood & Tears
Hypocrisy – The Final Chapter
Vader – Xeper
Ektomorf – Fire
Pro-Pain – Fuck It
Prime Sth. – From The Inside
Paradise Lost – True Belief
Nightwish – The End Of All Hope
Stormwitch – Tears By The Firelight
Samael – Jupiterian Vibe

CDs 
 Various Artists – Summer Breeze vs. Metal Blade (Promo CD, 2004)
(This CD was given out at the 2004 festival.)
Tracks
Six Feet Under – Blind & Gagged
Brainstorm – Doorway To Survive
Vomitory – Gore Apocalypse
Disillusion – And The Mirror Cracked
Fleshcrawl – Flesh Bloody Flesh
Criminal – Aberration
Fragments Of Unbecoming – The Seventh Sunray Enlights My Pathway
Gorerotted – Masticated By The Spasticated
Monstrosity – The Exordium
Nasty Savage – Psycho, Psycho
Torchbearer – Sown Are The Seeds Of Death
Cannibal Corpse – Decency Defied
Symphorce – Tears
Shining Fury – Speed Of Life

 Various Artists – Summer Breeze 2005 (Promo CD, 2005)

(This CD was given out at the 2005 festival.)

Tracks
End of Green – Dead End Hero
Born From Pain – The New Hate
Korpiklaani – Hunting Song
Powerwolf – Kiss Of The Cobra King
Wintersun – Beyond The Dark Sun
Enthroned – Crimson Legions
Ektomorf – Show Your Fist
Midnattsol – Another Return
Koroded – T.A.B.O.B.A.
Disbelief – Rewind It All
Symphorce – No Shelter
Anorexia Nervosa – Worship Manifesto
Such A Surge – Was jetzt?
Draconian – Death, Come Near Me
Impious – Wicked Saints
Die Apokalyptischen Reiter – Eruption
God Dethroned – Last Zip Of Spit
Barcode – No Lust For Life
Therion – Typhon

References

External links

 
 Summer Breeze 2012 - Info, News and Lineup so far
 Pictures of Summer Breeze Open Air 2009

Heavy metal festivals in Germany
Ostalbkreis
Ansbach (district)
Music festivals established in 1997